Euthenae or Euthenai was a coastal town of ancient Caria, on the Ceramicus Sinus. 
 
Its site is located near Altınsivrisi, Asiatic Turkey.

References

Populated places in ancient Caria
Former populated places in Turkey